Balázs Tóth may refer to:

 Balázs Tóth (footballer, born 1980), Hungarian football defender for Vasas SC
 Balázs Tóth (footballer, born 1981), Hungarian football midfielder for Videoton and Hungary
 Balázs Tóth (footballer, born 1997), Hungarian football goalkeeper for Puskás Akadémia FC
 Balázs Tóth (footballer, born 2004), Hungarian football goalkeeper for FC Liefering
 Balázs Tóth (gymnast) (born 1967), Hungarian Olympic gymnast
 Balázs Tóth B. (born 1986), Hungarian footballer